Jezioro Chełmżyńskie is a lake in north-central Poland, located near the town of Chełmża, Toruń County, Kuyavian-Pomeranian Voivodeship.

The lake is up to 6 km long,  has a width up to 0,5 km, is up to 27 m deep, and has an area of 2,7 km2.

References 

Chełmża
Chelmza